Cyril Féraud (born March 15, 1985 in Digne-les-Bains) is a French radio and television host and audiovisual producer working mainly for the public broadcaster France Télévisions since 2008. Féraud is the host of the game shows Slam, Duels en Familles and La Carte aux Trésors on France 3, in addition to Le Quiz des Champions and 100% Logique on France 2, and a number of live annual events.

He is the founder and manager of the audiovisual production company CyrilProd.

Biography 
Cyril Féraud was born on 15 March 1985 in Digne-les-Bains (Alpes-de-Haute-Provence). He is a only child and was passionate about television game shows from a young age. In the early 2000s, from the age of 16, he sent game ideas to the production team of the show Fort Boyard. After a master's degree in communication and management, he took his first steps in the industry as an assistant for this same programme "which made (him) want to do television".

Féraud began his career as a television host in 2004 at the helm of children's programs Zapping Zone and Art Attack on Disney Channel.

Media career
From 2005 to 2015, Féraud worked as a journalist for the weekly Télé Poche, as a reporter, head of the entertainment section, then as head of information.

In 2006, he made his radio debut as a columnist on Jean-Marc Morandini's Le Grand Direct program on Europe 1, with whom he worked for four seasons on the radio and television on the Morandini! program on Direct 8.

From August 29, 2016 to June 30, 2017, he hosts Midi avec vous on MFM Radio, Monday to Friday from noon to 1 p.m.

Television career 
Spotted by the Française des Jeux, he presented the new Lotto formula live on France 2 in October 2008, which he hosted for three years.

Since October 26, 2009, he has hosted every afternoon from Monday to Friday on France 3 the game Slam, which combines quizzes and crosswords. During the first two years, the game tripled the audience of the time slot with 1.4 million viewers on average, quickly making Féraud one of the channel's flagship hosts. Since 1 March 2015, he has been in charge of Le Grand Slam, the weekly version of Slam in which the best candidates in the game compete each Sunday.

From 2010, France 3 entrusts him with the presentation of various programs for the first part of the evening: Le Tournoi d'orthographe (2010), Le Grand Bêtisier (2010), Le Grand Jeu (2011), 300 chœurs pour + de vie (2012). After being the spokesperson for France at the contest in 2011, he was co-commentator for three years on the Eurovision Song Contest live on France 3: 26 May 2012, with Mireille Dumas, live from Baku, Azerbaijan. 18 May 2013, again with Dumas, live from Malmö, Sweden and on 10 May 2014, this time with Natasha St-Pier, in Copenhagen, Denmark.

In 2011, 2015–2016 and again from 2018 to 2021, he presented the quiz show Personne n’y avait pensé! (an adaptation of Pointless) on France 3, a game of general knowledge in which the candidates must score as less points as possible to win. In January 2018, the game moved to a daily broadcast just before Slam and replaced another game show Harry.

Since April 2018, after campaigning for its return, he has presented the new version of the adventure game show La Carte aux Trésors in prime time on France 3, the show having been absent from the air for nine years.

Since 2021, he has been presenting two major prime time events on France 2: Le Quiz des Champions (an adaptation of British ITV show Quiz Master), which sees the greatest TV game champions in France compete against each other, and 100% Logique (an adaptation of another ITV show The 1% Club), in which 100 candidates compete to test their logic and their sense of observation.

In March 2022, he presented Quelle sera la meilleure danse folklorique de France? (What will be the best folk dance in France?), a major competition in which the French regions come to demonstrate their traditional dances in prime time on France 3. Since August 2022, he has presented every day Duels en Familles on France 3, a French game show created by himself, in which two families compete in general knowledge duels. The game show airs daily, just before Slam.

Live show in prime time 

From 2013, he has played host at most of France 3's live performance programs in prime time: International Circus Festival of Monte-Carlo every year since 2013, Le Grand Spectacle du Festival Interceltique de Lorient every summer since 2015, Musiques en Fête live from the Chorégies d'Orange every year since 2017, La Folie Offenbach in January 2018, La Grande Parade des Nations Celtes since 2018.

Special events 

In March 2009, he presented the Sidaction evening live on France 2 alongside Line Renaud: 70 artists sang together in the streets of Paris. Then in March 2010, the Les Stars du Rire Spéciale Sidaction evening alongside Patrick Sabatier live on France 2.

A recurring host of the Téléthon since 2010, he has presented the launch party in prime time and live on France 3 with Sophie Davant since 2012.

In 2015 and 2016, during the whole Tour de France, he co-presented the program Village Départ with Laurent Luyat, and presented a sporting event every day, in which a local resident tries to beat a record, as well as a sequence on the heritage of the city visited.

In 2016 and 2017, he presented the 60 concerts of Âge Tendre, the Idol Tour, now produced by Christophe Dechavanne and which celebrated its tenth anniversary in the Zéniths of France with a dozen artists such as Sheila, Hugues Aufray, Gérard Lenorman, Les Rubettes. The recording of the show was broadcast on C8 on February 22, 2017 in prime time. In 2018, he presents for the second season the Age Tendre tour, with 62 performances in France, Belgium and Switzerland given by a dozen artists such as Sheila, Dave, Dick Rivers, Michèle Torr, Nicoletta broadcast by C8 on June 6, 2018 in prime time.

Participation in shows 
After being an assistant on the show Fort Boyard in 2003 and 2004, he participated on July 23, 2011 as a celebrity candidate, in the France 2 game for the first time. He participated again in 2012, 2013, 2016 and 2017. Since 2020, he has joined the show's team by playing the character of Cyril Gossbo (slang term for handsome), presenter of the game "Slaïme", a parody inspired by slime material and his own show, Slam.

In 2014, he took part in Toute la télé chante for the Sidaction on France 2. On February 20, 2015, he finished second in the celebrity quiz show Grand Concours des Animateurs (an adaptation of Britain's Brainiest Kid) behind Julien Arnaud, on TF1. On April 16, 2015, he won the French version of The Weakest Link on D8 for the association AIDES, sponsored by Roselyne Bachelot.

Since 2016, he has occasionally participated in the program Vendredi, tout est permis with Arthur on TF1. On February 6, 2021, he participated as a guest in La Boîte à secrets presented by Faustine Bollaert on France 3.

Chairty work 
In 2012, Cyril Féraud was the godfather of the association Grandir which supports families whose children suffer from growth problems.

Since 2020, he has been the godfather of the association Les lutins du Phoenix, whose volunteer members dress up as superheroes to visit children hospitalized in the pediatric oncology department.

Filmography

Television

References

External links

1985 births
Living people
People from Digne-les-Bains
French television presenters
French television journalists
French radio presenters